is a town located in Mie Prefecture, Japan. , the town had an estimated population of 8,847 in 4125 households and a population density of 24 persons per km².

Geography
Ōdai is located in southeastern Kii Peninsula in central Mie Prefecture. An inland municipality, Ōdai extends almost the width of Mie Prefecture from east to west, but is narrow north to south.

Neighboring municipalities
Mie Prefecture
Matsusaka
Taki
Taiki
Watarai
Kihoku
Nara Prefecture
Kawakami
Kamikitayama

Climate
Ōdai has a Humid subtropical climate (Köppen Cfa) characterized by warm summers and cool winters with light to no snowfall.  The average annual temperature in Ōdai is 14.2 °C. The average annual rainfall is 2683 mm with September as the wettest month. The temperatures are highest on average in August, at around 24.7 °C, and lowest in January, at around 3.7 °C.

Demographics
Per Japanese census data, the population of Ōdai has decreased steadily over the past 60 years and is now less than it was a century ago.

History
The area of present-day Ōdai was part of ancient Ise Province, but was mostly part of Kii Domain under the Edo period Tokugawa shogunate. The village of Misedani  in Taki District, Mie Prefecture, was established with the creation of the modern municipalities system on April 1, 1889. It was raised to town status in 1953. The town of Ōdai was established on September 30, 1956 by the merger Misedani with the village of Kawazoe. On January 1, 2006, the last remaining village in Mie Prefecture, Miyagawa Village, merged with Ōdai.

Government
Ōdai has a mayor-council form of government with a directly elected mayor and a unicameral city council of 11 members. Ōdai contributes two members to the Mie Prefectural Assembly. In terms of national politics, the town is part of Mie 4th district of the lower house of the Diet of Japan.

Economy
Ōdai serves as a commercial center for the surrounding region.

Education
Ōdai has four public elementary schools and two public middle schools operated by the town government. The town has one public high school operated by the Mie Prefectural Board of Education.

Transportation

Railway
 JR Tōkai – Kisei Main Line
  -  -  -

Highway
 Kisei Expressway
 }

Local attractions 
Mount Ōdaigahara

References

External links

Ōdai official website 

Towns in Mie Prefecture